Gareth Hopkins (born 14 June 1980) is an English football striker who plays for Bishop's Cleeve.

External links

1980 births
Living people
Sportspeople from Cheltenham
Sportspeople from Gloucestershire
English footballers
Association football forwards
Cheltenham Town F.C. players
Cinderford Town A.F.C. players
Bath City F.C. players
Forest Green Rovers F.C. players
Cirencester Town F.C. players
Weston-super-Mare A.F.C. players
Bishop's Cleeve F.C. players
English Football League players
National League (English football) players